Rashbehari Assembly constituency is a Legislative Assembly constituency of Kolkata district in the Indian state of West Bengal.

Overview
As per orders of the Delimitation Commission, No. 160 Rashbehari Assembly constituency is composed of the following: Ward Nos. 81, 83, 84, 86, 87, 88, 89, 90 and 93 of Kolkata Municipal Corporation.
Before 2011, Rasbehari Assembly constituency was composed of the following: Ward Nos. 83, 84, 85, 86, 87, 88 of Kolkata Municipal Corporation.

Rashbehari Assembly constituency is part of No. 23 Kolkata Dakshin (Lok Sabha constituency) .

Members of Legislative Assembly

Election results

2021

2016

2011

References

Assembly constituencies of West Bengal
Politics of Kolkata district